Eberhard Steinböck (born 30 November 1882, date of death unknown) was an Austrian sport shooter who competed in the 1912 Summer Olympics.

He was born in Spittal an der Drau. In 1912 he was a member of the Austrian team which finished fourth in the team 100 metre running deer, single shots competition. In the 100 metre running deer, single shots event he finished 31st.

References

1882 births
Year of death missing
People from Spittal an der Drau
Austrian male sport shooters
Running target shooters
Olympic shooters of Austria
Shooters at the 1912 Summer Olympics
Sportspeople from Carinthia (state)